Kelly Link (born July 19, 1969) is an American editor and author of short stories. While some of her fiction falls more clearly within genre categories, many of her stories might be described as slipstream or magic realism: a combination of science fiction, fantasy, horror, mystery, and realism. Among other honors, she has won a Hugo award, three Nebula awards, and a World Fantasy Award for her fiction, and she was one of the recipients of the 2018 MacArthur "Genius" Grant.

Biography 

Link is a graduate of Columbia University in New York and the MFA program of UNC Greensboro. In 1995, she attended the Clarion East Writing Workshop.

Link and husband Gavin Grant manage Small Beer Press, based in Northampton, Massachusetts. The couple's imprint of Small Beer Press for intermediate readers is called Big Mouth House. They also co-edited St. Martin's Press's Year's Best Fantasy and Horror anthology series with Ellen Datlow for five years, ending in 2008. (The couple inherited the "fantasy" side from Terri Windling in 2004.) Link also co-edits the literary magazine Lady Churchill’s Rosebud Wristlet, and was the slush reader for Sci Fiction, edited by Datlow.

Link taught at Lenoir-Rhyne College in Hickory, North Carolina, with the Visiting Writers Series for spring semester 2006. She has taught or visited at a number of schools and workshops including Bard College, Annandale-on-Hudson, New York; Brookdale Community College, Lincroft, New Jersey; the Imagination Workshop at Cleveland State University; New England Institute of Art & Communications, Brookline, Massachusetts; Clarion East at Michigan State University; Clarion West in Seattle, Washington; and Smith College, near her home in Northampton. She has participated in the Juniper Summer Writing Institute at the University of Massachusetts Amherst's MFA Program for Poets & Writers.

Awards

 2018 MacArthur Fellowship
 2017 World Fantasy Award for contributions to the genre (nominee)

Books
 Get in Trouble: 2016 Pulitzer Prize (fiction) finalist.
 Pretty Monsters: 2008 World Fantasy and Locus Award finalist.
 Magic for Beginners: 2006 Locus Award for best short story collection
 Stranger Things Happen: 2001 Salon Book of the Year, Village Voice favorite (available here  as a free download, under a Creative Commons license)

Selected stories (award winners)
 "The Game of Smash and Recovery": 2016 Theodore Sturgeon Award for Best Short Fiction
 "The Summer People": 2011 Shirley Jackson Award for best Novelette, 2013 The O. Henry Prize Stories
 "Pretty Monsters": 2009 Locus Award for Best Novella
 "Magic for Beginners": 2005 Nebula Award for Best Novella
 "The Faery Handbag": 2005 Hugo and Nebula Award for Best Novelette, Locus Award winner
 "Stone Animals": 2005 Best American Short Stories
 "Louise's Ghost": 2001 Nebula Award for Best Novelette
 "The Specialist's Hat": 1999 World Fantasy Award
 "Travels with the Snow Queen": 1997 James Tiptree, Jr. Award

As author
4 Stories (chapbook), Small Beer Press, 2000
Stranger Things Happen, Small Beer Press, 2001
Magic for Beginners, Small Beer Press, 2005, reprinted by Harcourt, 2005
Catskin: a swaddled zine, Jelly Ink Press, date unknown
Pretty Monsters: Stories, Viking Juvenile, 2008
The Wrong Grave, 2009
Get in Trouble: Stories, Random House, 2015
 White Cat, Black Dog: Stories, Random House, 2023

As editor
Trampoline  Small Beer Press, 2003
The Year's Best Fantasy and Horror volume 17– (with Ellen Datlow and Gavin J. Grant) St. Martin's Press, 2004–2008

In addition, Link and Grant have edited a semiannual small press fantasy magazine: Lady Churchill's Rosebud Wristlet (or LCRW) since 1997. An anthology, The Best of Lady Churchill's Rosebud Wristlet, was published by Del Rey Books in 2007.

References

External links

  Official website
Lady Churchill's Rosebud Wristlet

Kelly Link's awards and nominations at the Science Fiction Awards Database
Essay on Link's story "Lull" at Fantastic Metropolis
RealAudio Interview from KCRW's Bookworm show
An excerpt from Origin Story from the magazine A Public Space
 Reading by Kelly from the Stonecoast MFA program's Winter 2008 residency 

1969 births
20th-century American short story writers
21st-century American short story writers
American fantasy writers
American science fiction writers
Magic realism writers
American short story writers
Hugo Award-winning writers
Living people
Nebula Award winners
Print editors
Women science fiction and fantasy writers
World Fantasy Award-winning writers
Writers from Northampton, Massachusetts
University of Massachusetts Amherst faculty
American women short story writers
Chapbook writers
Columbia College (New York) alumni
University of North Carolina at Greensboro alumni
Writers from Massachusetts
Creative Commons-licensed authors
MacArthur Fellows
Women speculative fiction editors
Weird fiction writers
21st-century American women writers
O. Henry Award winners